The Citroën Type A was produced from June 1919 to December 1921 in Paris, France. It was the first car Citroën made. 24,093 were built.

Origins
During World War I, André Citroën was producing ammunition. As early as 1917, Citroën investigated the development of a light car of the medium range, under the direction of Jules Salomon.

The car
Its maximum speed was 65 km/h (40 mph). The chassis had inverted quarter elliptic springs at the front and double quarter elliptics at the rear. Braking was on the rear wheels only controlled by a hand lever with a foot pedal operated transmission brake.

The chassis was made in two lengths and could carry a variety of coachwork. The long chassis was available as Torpedo (four-seat tourer), Torpedo Sport, Conduite Intérieure, Coupé de ville and light truck and the short chassis with Torpedo (3-seat), Conduite Intérieure, Coupé de Ville and camionette (van). The shorter  wheelbase chassis was available only on demand until the start of 1920 after which the option was withdrawn in order to maximize standardization and derive the resulting cost and efficiency benefits. 

The final drive used a bevel gear with herringbone teeth, whose shape was the inspiration for the Citroën double chevron logo.

Commercial

In its first year of production, the standard Type A cost 7,950 francs. One year later the selling price had increased to 12,500 francs.

After a slightly hesitant start in 1919, sales took off in 1920, during which more than 20,000 cars emerged from the factory in a single year. With a production rate of 100 vehicles a day, Citroën became the first mass production manufacturer in Europe.

Notes

Further reading
André Citroën -The man and the motor car. John Reynoolds. Sutton Publishing, Gloucestershire, UK. 1996. 

Type A
First car made by manufacturer
Cars introduced in 1919

Citroën 10 HP Type A - Citroën Origins

1920s cars